The 1976 Vancouver Whitecaps season was the third season of the Whitecaps, and third second season in the North American Soccer League and the top flight of Canadian soccer.

The Whitecaps made a bit of a splash signing American goalkeeper Phil Parkes, who starred with the United Soccer Association's Los Angeles Wolves in 1967 and with Kansas City Spurs in 1969.

The Vancouver Whitecaps also played some European sides on exhibition tours.

In May 1976 the Glasgow Rangers made a tour of the Pacific Northwest NASL clubs. The Vancouver Whitecaps tied them 2-2 on May 18, 1976, in front of 14,000 spectators.

On May 25, 1976, the Vancouver Whitecaps tied Manchester United 0-0.

The Vancouver Whitecaps had a 4-3 victory over Borussia Mönchengladbach on July 27, 1976, in front of 11,533 spectators.  This game has been noted as a very entertaining affair that earned Borussia Monchengladbach some Vancouver fans as they played competitively.

Squad 

The 1976 squad

Competitions

Preseason

NASL

Standings

Pacific Conference
Pld = Matches played; W = Matches won; L = Matches lost; GF = Goals for; GA = Goals against; GD = Goal difference; Pts = PointsSource:

Results summary

Results by round

Match results

NASL Playoffs

Mid-season friendlies

See also
History of Vancouver Whitecaps FC

External links
 
 The Year in American Soccer - 1976

References

Vancouver Whitecaps (1974–1984) seasons
Vancouver Whitecaps Season, 1976
Vancouver Whitecaps
Vancouver Whitecaps